Crescent is a populated place in Rowan County, North Carolina, United States.

History
The Crescent post office existed from March 5, 1898 to May 29, 1925.  Rev. Dr. J.M.L. Lyerly was the first post master of Crescent.  Rev. Lyerly was a native of Crescent and head of the Crescent Academy that he founded and conducted.  He was known as a leader of the Reformed Church in North Carolina.

Crescent has been in the Gold Hill Township since 1868, when the North Carolina state constitution required counties to be divide into townships.

Geography
Crescent is located at latitude 35° 34′ 31″ N and longitude 80° 25′ 13″ W. The elevation is 807 feet.

Demographics
Crescent has always been a small community.   Since 1870, the census population of Gold Hill Township includes the population of Crescent.

References

Unincorporated communities in Rowan County, North Carolina
Unincorporated communities in North Carolina